Kidsgrove railway station serves the town of Kidsgrove in Staffordshire, England. The station is served by trains on the Crewe to Derby Line which is also a community rail line known as the North Staffordshire line. The station is owned by Network Rail and managed by East Midlands Railway.

In the year 2009–10 the usage of the station grew by almost 58% to over 100,000 recorded journeys, in addition more than 6,434 passengers used the station to change trains. The increase in usage (followed by a similar increase for 2010–11) has been attributed to improved timetable in December 2008 (specifically the introduction of London Midland's service to London Euston via Tamworth).

History

The present station was opened 9 October 1848 by the North Staffordshire Railway as Harecastle and was during the early years of the North Staffordshire era variously called Harecastle Junction, Kidsgrove Junction. Kidsgrove Junction, Harecastle before settling upon Harecastle in 1875. Between 1885 and 1886 and 1923 and 1924 it was called Harecastle for Kidsgrove. In 1944 it was renamed Kidsgrove.

In British Rail days it was known as Kidsgrove Central when the town had three stations, the other two were Kidsgrove Liverpool Rd and Market Street Halt on the old North Staffordshire Railway's Potteries Loop Line (all three stations were opened by the North Staffordshire Railway). It is situated on the Manchester branch of the West Coast Main Line at the junction where the line from Stoke-on-Trent divides for Crewe and Manchester Piccadilly.

It is just north of the Harecastle Tunnels on the Trent and Mersey Canal and the Harecastle railway tunnel and 1965 railway diversion.

Platforms and services

Services
Services at Kidsgrove are operated by East Midlands Railway using Class 156, 158 and 170 DMUs, London Northwestern Railway using Class 350 EMUs and Northern Trains using Class 323 and 331 EMUs.

The typical off-peak service in trains per hour is:
 2 tph to 
 1 tph to 
 1 tph to  via  and 
 1 tph to  only
 1 tph to  via 

On Sundays, the station is served by an hourly service between Crewe and Birmingham and 6 trains per day to Manchester. Hourly Sunday services operate between Crewe and Derby after 14:00 only.

No services operated by Avanti West Coast or CrossCountry call at Kidsgrove (though 2 Cross Country and 2 Avanti West Coast services pass through platforms 1 & 2 each hour).

Platforms
The station has 4 platforms. Platform 1 serves the hourly Northern service to Stoke-on-Trent. Platform 2 serves the hourly Northern services to Manchester Piccadilly. Platform 3 serves both the East Midlands Railway services to Derby and the London Northwestern Railway services to Birmingham New Street. Platform 4 serves both the East Midlands Railway and London Northwestern Railway services to Crewe.

References

External links

Kidsgrove
Railway stations in Staffordshire
Category'DfT Category E stations
Former North Staffordshire Railway stations
Railway stations in Great Britain opened in 1848
Railway stations served by East Midlands Railway
Northern franchise railway stations
Rail junctions in England
Railway stations served by West Midlands Trains